Abanoub (born 2 February 1957) is a clergyman of the Coptic Orthodox Church, since 2013 bishop of Al-Mokattam.

Monastic life
On 17 April 1992, he made his religious vows. He was ordained a priest on 23 January 2005. He was ordained bishop on 15 June 2013.

See also
 Coptic Orthodox Church
 Holy Synod of the Coptic Orthodox Church

References

External links
 Bishop Abanoub

1957 births
Living people
Place of birth missing (living people)